Achyranthes aspera (common  names:  chaff-flower, prickly chaff flower, devil's horsewhip, Sanskrit: अपामार्ग apāmārga) is a species of plant in the family Amaranthaceae. It is distributed throughout the tropical world. It can be found in many places growing as an introduced species and a common weed. It is an invasive species in some areas, including many Pacific Islands environments.

Description
Habit : A wild, perennial, erect herb.
Stem : Herbaceous but woody below, erect, branched, cylindrical, solid, angular, hairy, longitudinally striated, nodes and internodes are prominent, green but violet or pink at nodes.
Leaves : Ramal and cauline, simple, exstipulate, opposite decussate, petiolate, ovate or obovate, entire, acute or acuminate, hairy all over, unicostate reticulate.
Inflorescence : A spike with reflexed flowers arranged on long peduncle.
Flowers :Bracteate , bracteolate , bracteoles two, shorter than perianth , dry, membranous and persistent, sessile, complete, hermaphrodite, actinomorphic , pentamerous, hypogynous, small, spinescent, green.
Bracts ovate, persistent, awned.
Perianth made up of 5 tepals, polyphyllous, imbricate or quincuncial, green, ovate to oblong, persistent.
Androecium made up of 10 stamens, out of which 5 are fertile and 5 are scale-like, fimbriated, sterile staminodes, both alternating with each other, fertile stamens are antiphyllous, monadelphous, filaments slightly fused at the base, dithecous, dorsifixed or versatile, introrse.
Gynoecium: it is bicarpellary, syncarpous, superior, unilocular, ovule one, basal placentation, style single and filiform, stigma capitate.
Fruits : Oblong utricle
Seeds : Endospermic with curved embryo, 2 mm long, oblong black.
Flowering and Fruiting time : September to April

Significance  
It is very useful in dropsy, piles, boils and for colic in children. 
It is also used as a cure for cough.

Uses
The juice of this plant is a potent ingredient for a mixture of wall plaster, according to the Samarāṅgaṇa Sūtradhāra, which is a Sanskrit treatise dealing with Śilpaśāstra (Hindu precepts of art and construction).

It is one of the 21 leaves used in the Ganesh Patra Pooja done regularly on Ganesh Chaturthi day.

Traditional medicine

A. aspera has been used in folk medicine in countries including Australia.

The 1889 book The Useful Native Plants of Australia records that this plant was found "in all the tropical and sub-tropical regions of the old world. The herb is administered in India in cases of dropsy. The seeds are given in hydrophobia, and in cases of snake-bites, as well as in ophthalmia and cutaneous diseases. The flowering spikes, rubbed with a little sugar, are made into pills, and given internally to people bitten by mad dogs. The leaves, taken fresh and reduced to a pulp, are considered a good remedy when applied externally to the bites of scorpions. The ashes of the plant yield a considerable quantity of potash, which is used in washing clothes. The flowering spike has the reputation in India (Oude) of being a safeguard against scorpions, which it is believed to paralyse. (Drury.)"

Chemical constituents
Achyranthes aspera contains triterpenoid saponins which possess oleanolic acid as the aglycone. Ecdysterone, an insect moulting hormone, and long chain alcohols are also found in Achyranthes aspera.

References

External links

aspera
Flora of Nepal
Medicinal plants of Asia
Plants described in 1753
Plants used in traditional African medicine
Taxa named by Carl Linnaeus